Certhia  is the  genus of birds containing the typical treecreepers, which together with the African and Indian spotted creepers make up the family Certhiidae.

The typical treecreepers occur in many wooded parts of the North Temperate Zone. They do not normally migrate other than for local movements, such as altitudinal migrations in the Himalayan species.

The treecreepers are small woodland birds, very similar in appearance (so they can present serious identification problems where two species occur together).  They are brown with streaks above and white below. They have thin pointed down-curved bills, which they use to extricate insects from bark. They have stiff, pointed tail feathers, like woodpeckers and woodcreepers, which they use to support themselves on vertical trees.  All the tail feathers but the two central ones are molted in quick succession; the two central ones are not molted till the others grow back, so the bird can always prop itself with its tail.

They build cup nests on loose twig platforms wedged behind patches of bark on tree trunks.  (They will also use special nest boxes clamped to tree trunks and made with two openings; the birds use one as an entrance and one as an exit.) They lay 3 to 9 eggs (usually 5 or 6), which are white with reddish-brown speckles and dots.  The female incubates for 14 or 15 days.  The young fledge 15 or 16 days later; the male may care for them while the female incubates and feeds a second brood.  Rarely a male may mate with a second female while the first is incubating, and there are even records of two females incubating their clutches side by side in a nest.

At least some species roost in small oblong cavities that they dig out behind loose bark.  They may roost individually or in groups (probably families) that in extreme cold have been known to exceed 12 birds.

Taxonomy
The genus Certhia was introduced in 1758 by the Swedish naturalist Carl Linnaeus in the tenth edition of his Systema Naturae. The genus name is from the Ancient Greek κερθιος/kerthios, a small insectivorous bird that lived in trees mentioned by Aristotle, perhaps a treecreeper. The type species is the Eurasian treecreeper (Certhia familiaris).

Species
Based on studies of cytochrome b  mtDNA sequence and song structure, the following nine species are recognized:

Eurasian treecreeper, Certhia familiaris
Hodgson's treecreeper, Certhia hodgsoni (split from  C. familiaris)
Brown creeper, Certhia americana
Short-toed treecreeper, Certhia brachydactyla
Bar-tailed treecreeper, Certhia himalayana
Rusty-flanked treecreeper, Certhia nipalensis
Sikkim treecreeper, Certhia discolor
Hume's treecreeper, Certhia manipurensis (split from  C. discolor)
Sichuan treecreeper, Certhia tianquanensis

They form two evolutionary  lineages: the former four species represent a Holarctic radiation, whereas the remaining five are distributed in the area south and east of the Himalaya. Hodgson's treecreeper, recently realized to be a distinct species, is an offshoot of the common treecreeper's ancestor which has speciated south of the Himalaya. The former group has a more warbling song, always (except in C. familiaris from China) starting or ending with a shrill sreeh. The Himalayan group, in contrast, has a faster-paced trill without the sreeh sound.

Fossil record

Certhia immensa (Pliocene of Csarnota, Hungary)

References

External links
Treecreeper videos on the Internet Bird Collection

 
Bird genera